Kryštofovo Údolí is a municipality and village in Liberec District in the Liberec Region of the Czech Republic. It has about 400 inhabitants. The village is well preserved and is protected by law as a village monument zone.

Administrative parts
The village of Novina is an administrative part of Kryštofovo Údolí.

Etymology
The name means "Kryštof's valley (Christopher's valley)". It was probably named after Kryštof of Donín (German: Christoph von Dohna), who owned the area and is one of the possible founders of the village.

Geography
In lies in a hilly landscape of the Ještěd–Kozákov Ridge. The municipal border runs through the peaks and ridges of several other prominent hills, such as Černá hora (811 m), Rozsocha (767 m), Kaliště (745 m), and Malý Ještěd (754 m).

The built-up area is situated in the valley of the Rokytka Stream. The Lusatian Neisse flows shortly along the northeastern municipal border. Their confluence is located on the municipal border.

History
The place arose in a left side valley of the Lusatian Neisse as a charcoal and mining settlement. According to legends, the settlement was founded in the 15th century by a charcoal burner named Christophorus, but it is proven that the area was not settled in 1518. The area was then part of the Lemberk estate bought by the advocatus of the Upper Lusatia, Wilhelm von Eilenburg. Ore mining in the area began in the 16th century. In the mid-16th century, Křižany and the area of Kryštofovo Údolí were separated from the estate and sold to Nicholas II of Donín, who joined it to the Grabštejn estate.

The first written mention of Kryštofovo Údolí and Novina (under their German names Christofsgrund and Neuland) is from 1581, when the estate was bought by Jindřich Berka of Dubá, and a hammer mill in the village was mentioned. The settlement of Rokytnice (German: Eckersbach), which later merged with Kryštofovo Údolí, was founded between 1518 and 1528. In the course of the Counter Reformation after the Thirty Years' War, a large part of the Protestant population left the place and Catholics were settled. Mining was operated until about 1750, but was stopped due to the poor yield.

In 1826, the entrepreneurs Siegmund and Neuhäuser from Liberec built a textile factory below Christofsgrund on the Lusatian Neisse. Between 1852 and 1858, the main trunkroad was built. In 1856–1859, the railway from Liberec to Zittau was built, and the railway that passed right through the village was built in 1900.

At the beginning of the 20th century, most of the population were Germans. The main source of livelihood was agriculture, especially arable farming and cattle breeding, but due to its difficult operation in the hilly landscape and low yields, many residents worked in forestry, worked as craftsmen in the surrounding villages, or commuted to work in factories in nearby Liberec.

In 1921, the Czech name of the municipality was changed to Údol Svatého Kryštofa. As a result of the Munich Agreement, Christofsgrund was annexed by Nazi Germany in 1938. After the war, the Germans were expelled. In 1960, the municipality was renamed Kryštofovo Údolí. From 1980 to 1990, Kryštofovo Údolí was incorporated into Chrastava.

Demographics

Transport

Kryštofovo Údolí lies on the railway line leading from Liberec to Děčín.

Sights

The village of Kryštofovo Údolí is protected as a village monument zone for a preserved set of folk architecture, consisting of multi-story houses with a timbered ground floor and half-timbered floor. The landmark and the most valuable monument is the wooden Church of Saint Christopher. It was built in the early Baroque style in 1683–1684. It is one of the few preserved timbered building with slate cladding. The walls and ceiling of the church are decorated with fifteen paintings from the life of Christ. Next to the church are wooden bell tower and mortuary, and a Baroque rectory from 1786.

In the centre of Kryštofovo Údolí there is a stone bridge with a statue of St. John of Nepomuk. Other minor monuments are the Chapel of St. Christopher on the saddle between the mountains Malý Vápenný and Lom, and the Chapel of the Virgin Mary.

There is a Museum of Nativity Scenes in U Kryštofa Inn with twenty nativity scenes. The oldest exhibit dates from 1846.

Kryštofovo Údolí astronomical clock is a modern astronomical clock created in a former electrical substation.

Railway viaducts and tunnels near Novina are technical monuments. The most notable is the Novina Viaduct, which was put into operation in 1900. It is an important technical work and a cultural monument.

References

External links

Villages in Liberec District